Elizabeth Henshilwood (born 23 June 1975) is a British rower. In the 1997 World Rowing Championships, she won a gold medal in the women's coxless four event.

References

See also

British female rowers
World Rowing Championships medalists for Great Britain
Living people
1975 births